Marquette High School may refer to a secondary school in the United States:

Marquette High School (Iowa), a Catholic high school in Bellevue, Iowa
Marquette High School (Missouri), a public high school in Chesterfield, Missouri

See also
Marquette Academy, a Catholic high school in Ottawa, Illinois
Marquette Catholic High School (Illinois), in Alton, Illinois
Marquette Catholic High School (Indiana), in Michigan City, Indiana
Marquette Catholic Schools, formerly in West Point, Iowa
Marquette Senior High School in Marquette, Michigan
Marquette University High School, a Jesuit high school in Milwaukee, Wisconsin